Nevada is an unincorporated community in Livingston County, in the U.S. state of Illinois.

History
A post office called Nevada was established in 1870, and remained in operation until 1921. Oakdale Reformatory for Women opened in 1930, later becoming the Dwight Correctional Center. 2013 brought the closing of the facility. The community was named after the state of Nevada.

References

Unincorporated communities in Livingston County, Illinois
1870 establishments in Illinois
Unincorporated communities in Illinois